"One Little Victory" is the opening track and first single from Rush's 2002 album Vapor Trails, with music by Geddy Lee and Alex Lifeson, and lyrics by Neil Peart. To herald the band's comeback after a five-year hiatus, the single was designed to grab the attention of listeners with its rapid guitar and drum tempos.

A remixed version of "One Little Victory" appears on the compilation album Retrospective 3. The song also appears in the soundtrack for the video game Need for Speed: Hot Pursuit 2, released in 2002.

Track listing

See also
List of Rush songs

References

Rush (band) songs
2002 singles
Songs written by Neil Peart
2002 songs
Atlantic Records singles
Songs written by Geddy Lee
Songs written by Alex Lifeson
Heavy metal songs